Dariusz Kozubek (born April 11, 1975) is a football player who currently plays for Korona Kielce. He has returned to Korona recently as they have entered the second league.

Kozubek has previously played for Szczakowianka Jaworzno, Polonia Warsaw, Korona Kielce and Zagłębie Sosnowiec Korona Kielce in the Polish Ekstraklasa.

References

1975 births
Living people
Polish footballers
Korona Kielce players
Sportspeople from Kielce
Association football midfielders